Main Directorate for Internal Affairs of Khabarovsk Krai (УМВД России по Хабаровскому краю; Главного управления Министерства внутренних дел Российской Федерации по Хабаровской край) or the Police of Khabarovsk Krai (Полиции Хабаровского края) is the main law enforcement agency in Government of Khabarovsk Krai in Russian Far East and Far Eastern Federal District.

The central headquarters is in Khabarovsk.

History
The first police force in Khabarovsk Krai was established on 28 April 1880 as Police Department (полицейское управление), and was called Khabarovka Police. First Police Master was Pyotr Prokopievich Khomyakov, who was soon replaced by Stepan Kozminovich Novoselov.

In 1893 the Khabarovka city renamed to Khabarovsk, and on 1 January 1895 the Armed Police Department (Окружное Полицейское Управление) has been formed under the command of Alexander Mikhailovich Chernov, who was known in Russian Far East as successful fighter against crime and as Chairman of Sanitary Executive Commission and the founder of local fire-fighters force.

In 1906, Lev Tauz has been appointed as Head of Police, he was the head of police during the last days of the Russian Empire and continue to fill his duty after the Russian Revolution, until 1917. He was replaced by Fyodor Barinov who was arrested on 5 March 1917.

In November 1917 the Czarist police became the People's Militsiya. The militia become part of NKVD until the end of WWII.

The police of Khabarovsk Krai has been re-formed officially on 26 October 1956 after governmental decision to improve the police activities. Before 1956 the police forces were subordinated to the national police, the Militsiya. According to the new status the police has become part of the local government.

In February 1969, the police was re-organised, and during the process, the following departments were established:
 Criminal Investigations Department
 Direction against Economic Crimes 
 State Traffic Police
 Special Police force

After the Cold War and the Soviet Union has been dissolved, The police continue to carry out the soviet name, Militsiya, until the Dmitry Medvedev's police reform from 2011, when all the police forces in Russia's territory return their previous, historic name: the Politsiya.

Management
 Andrei Fyodorovich Sergeyeev, Head of Main Directorate for Internal Affairs of Khabarovsk Krai (Начальник УМВД России по Хабаровскому краю) – Since 28 July 2010
 Natalia Nikolaevna Glukhikh, Head Deputy of Main Directorate for Internal Affairs and the Head of Investigative Department
 Ivan Egorovich Iltz, Head Deputy of Main Directorate for Internal Affairs, Head of Police
 Structure

Central apparatus
 Central Investigation Department
Department of organization of the Spetsnaz
Directorate for public order
Zonal dog service center
Department for records and mode
Center for licenses and permits
Department of inquiry
Department for regional departments
Office for Combating Economic Crimes
Directorate for private security
Office of the Traffic Police (GAI)
The Personnel Office
Department of Internal Security
The Center for Combating offenses in the consumer market and the implementation of administrative law
Forensic Center
Audit Division
Center for Information Technology, Communications and Information Protection (TsITSiZI)

Territorial structure
 Amur Region Police
 Ayano-May Region Police
 Bikin Region Police
 Vanin Region Police
 Higher-Burein Region Police
 Vyazem Pregion Police
 Komsomolsk Region Police
 Nanay Region Police
 Nikolaevsk Region Police
 Okhotsk Region Police
 Lazo Region Police
 Polina Osipenko Region Police
 Soviet-Havana Region Police
 Sun Region Police
 Tuguro-Chumikan Region Police
 Ulch Region Police
 Khabarovsk Region
 Komsomolsk-on-Amur City Police
 Khabarovsk City Police

External links
Official Homepage

Law enforcement agencies of Russia
Government agencies established in 1880
Khabarovsk Krai